This is the order of battle for the Battle of Albuera (16 May 1811).  The Battle of Albuera was an engagement of the Peninsular War, fought between a mixed British, Spanish, and Portuguese corps and elements of the French Armée du Midi (Army of the South). It took place at the small Spanish village of Albuera, about 12 miles (20 km) south of the frontier fortress-town of Badajoz, Spain.
Marshal Sir William Beresford had been given the task of reconstructing the Portuguese army since February 1809.  He temporarily took command of General Rowland Hill's corps while Hill was recovering from illness, and was granted overall command of the Allied army at Albuera by the Spanish generals, Joaquín Blake y Joyes and Francisco Castaños.

Abbreviations used

Military rank
 Gen = General
 Lt Gen = Lieutenant-General
 Maj Gen = Major-General 
 GD = général de division
 Brig Gen = Brigadier-General 
 GB = général de brigade
 Col = Colonel
 Lt Col = Lieutenant Colonel
 Maj = Major
 Capt = Captain
 Lt = Lieutenant

Other
 (w) = wounded
 (mw) = mortally wounded
 (k) = killed in action
 (c) = captured

Allied army 

Commander-in-Chief of the Allied Army: Marshal William C. Beresford

Anglo-Portuguese Forces

Spanish Forces 

Commander-in-Chief of the Spanish Forces: Gen Joaquín Blake y Joyes

4th Army 

Commander-in-Chief: Gen Joaquín Blake y Joyes

5th Army 
Commander-in-Chief: Gen Francisco Castaños

French Armée du Midi (Army of the South) 
Commander-in-Chief: Marshal Jean-de-Dieu Soult

V Corps d'Armée 
GD Jean-Baptiste Girard

Notes

References 

;

;

.

Napoleonic Wars orders of battle
Peninsular War orders of battle